is a Japanese MMA fighter, singer, actor and politician who has been serving as a political independent in the House of Councillors since 2019. Between 1998 and 2006, Sudo was a professional athlete and then was in the entertainment industry from 2006 to 2019. He has since returned to his previous position in World Order as of September 2021 where he is currently active.

He is a retired mixed martial artist and a kickboxer who, until 31 December 2006 competed in the Japanese fighting organization HERO'S and before that, the Ultimate Fighting Championship and Pancrase. He is known for his elaborate ring entrances and unorthodox fighting style. Over his career, he holds notable wins over Nate Marquardt, Royler Gracie, Eric "Butterbean" Esch, Mike Brown, Kazuyuki Miyata, Hiroyuki Takaya, Damacio Page and Ramon Dekkers. Sudo, following his retirement, transitioned into a career in entertainment as a Japanese singer, composer, choreographer, actor, professional calligrapher and author. He is the producer, director, and lead vocalist of the music group World Order, which is known for their techno music style and highly synchronised robotic choreography.

His philosophy is "We are all one".

Early life
Born to a chef and Boxing fan, Genki was named after Yu Koyama's sports anime Ganbare Genki. He started practicing Amateur Wrestling during high school, focusing on Greco-Roman Wrestling, and later won JOC Cup All Japan Junior Wrestling Championship during his stay at the Takushoku Junior College. In 1998, after graduating, Genki moved to the United States and enrolled in Santa Monica College, but dropped out soon after. Around this time, he joined the Beverly Hills Jiu-Jitsu Club and practiced Brazilian Jiu Jitsu. A year after, he returned to Japan to compete in Pancrase by Bas Rutten's mediation.

MMA career

Pancrase
Genki started his professional career in shoot wrestling promotion Pancrase, defeating Kosei Kubota by unanimous decision in his first fight. He joined Sanae Kikuta's Grabaka team to further develop his grappling skills.

Sudo became well known for his particularly flashy choreographed ring entrances that often included costumed dancers. One entrance featured Sudo doing the robot and operating levers that released a column of smoke from the top of his head while wearing a Kentucky Fried Chicken bucket as a hat and a white plastic mask, in an homage to the musician Buckethead.

On 21 December 2001, Sudo fought against Kenichi Yamamoto at Yokohama Cultural Gymnasium, and won by Rear Naked Choke. Prior to the match, Sudo and Yamamoto promised to bet Yamamoto's UFC championship belt on the outcome. Following his win, Sudo was given the belt by Yamamoto, and Sudo was introduced as "UFC Japan Champion" by media after this bout. As the bet was personal, he is not sanctioned as champion by Zuffa.

UFC
Sudo had his debut in Ultimate Fighting Championship at UFC 38, facing Leigh Remedios. Making his entrance in a kimono and a tengu mask, Sudo showed his personal style by dancing and throwing spin kicks to open the match, eventually launching a flying triangle choke attempt which lasted for most of the round. At the second round, Genki threw Remedios with a hip throw and locked a rear naked choke, making him tap out. The Japanese wrestler then posed with a flag of all the nations and proclaimed his catchphrase of "We Are All One" for a crowd pop.

He returned at UFC 42 against Duane Ludwig. Again Sudo showed his theatrical side, walking backwards towards Ludwig and doing the robot dance before taking him down. However, despite his initial domination, the Japanese started receiving damage while standing, failing in a rolling kneebar and several takedown attempts. Sudo came back at the last round, taking down Ludwig and pounding and bloodying him with punches and elbows. Whilst Ludwig was taking a beating, referee John McCarthy interrupted and stood the two fighters up to check on Ludwig's nose. When the doctor allowed the fight to resume they did not restart from the same previous dominant position held by Sudo. Ludwig took advantage of the indirect rest given to him and avoided, with the aid of the referee's decision, the unfavorable position that he was in. He dominated the end of the fight landing hurtful shots on Sudo to win a split decision. Ludwig mocked Sudo after the final bell with a crane kick pose.

Sudo's last fight in UFC would be against the debuting Mike Brown in UFC 47. Brown tried to capitalize in Sudo's confusing moves by rushing him against the fence, managing to slam him on the mat, but Sudo then locked a triangle choke and transitioned into an armbar for the tap out.

Hero's
Genki Sudo was defeated by K-1 HERO's lightweight champion Norifumi "Kid" Yamamoto. The fight was won by a controversial referee stoppage after Sudo was knocked down by a right hand which was followed by some punches.

At K-1 Dynamite! on 31 December 2006 he defeated Damacio Page by submission. After his win, and to the shock of the crowd, Sudo announced his retirement.

After retirement

Prior to his retirement on New Year's Eve Sudo fought for K-1 HERO's, the mixed martial arts branch of the most popular Japanese combat sports circuit.

In 2008, he accepted the position of Manager for Takushoku University’s wrestling team. In the 2009 Eastern Japan University League Games, the 2009 All Japan University Greco-Roman Championship Tournament, and the 2010 All Japan University Wrestling Conference, he was awarded the prize for Best Manager. In addition, he led the team to victory in the 2010 All Japan Student Wrestling Championship, and in his second year as manager Takushoku University was victorious at all four of the biggest student wrestling tournaments. In 2010, he was made the Japanese representative manager for the World University Championship.

Sudo was cast in Kamen Rider W Forever: A to Z/The Gaia Memories of Fate (仮面ライダーＷ（ダブル） FOREVER AtoZ／運命のガイアメモリ) in 2010 as Kyosui Izumi, member of NEVER and user of the T2 Luna Memory. He reprised his role in Kamen Rider Eternal, in Kamen Rider W Returns which was released on 21 July 2011. He has also finished filming his part of the movie The R246 Story.

On 8 April 2010 he received his black belt in Brazilian jiu-jitsu under Naoyoshi Watanabe at Triforce Academy.

Kickboxing career
Sudo participated in a K-1 tournament in 2002. He lost in the semi-finals. He has had important matches against Masato and Albert Kraus, both going to decisions.

Fighting style
A fighter with unorthodox striking and grappling ability, he has won fights by flashy knockout in both mixed martial arts and kickboxing. Among the unusual techniques that he favors and can use effectively are the spinning backfist, flying triangle choke and flying armbar, as well as dancing and turning his back to opponents to taunt or distract them.

Personal life
Sudo is a practicing Buddhist. He married on 22 November 2007, but got divorced in 2014.

Sudo has written 15 books and has started an amateur baseball team for people 30 and over.

On 1 August 2009, Sudo and his office made an official statement to say information on Wikipedia was wrong. According to their statement, the bout between Sudo and Tiki Ghosn was originally declared a draw which was overturned after Sudo's corner man, Bas Rutten, objected, at which point Sudo was declared the winner and given a medal.

On 25 January 2010, Sudo took the entrance examination of Takushoku University Graduate School and he was admitted to the school on 29 January. He entered the Local Government Course (Master's Program) of the Graduate School of Local Government.

Instructor lineage

Brazilian jiu-jitsu
Jigoro Kano → Mitsuyo "Count Koma" Maeda → Carlos Gracie, Sr. → Helio Gracie → Rolls Gracie → Romero "Jacaré" Cavalcanti → Alexandre Paiva → Naoyoshi Watanabe → Genki Sudo

Shoot wrestling
Billy Riley → Karl Gotch → Yoshiaki Fujiwara → Masakatsu Funaki → Genki Sudo

Mixed martial arts record

|-
| Win
| align=center| 16–4–1
| Damacio Page
| Submission (triangle choke)
| K-1 PREMIUM 2006 Dynamite!!
| 
| align=center| 1
| align=center| 3:05
| Osaka, Japan
| 
|-
| Win
| align=center| 15–4–1
| Ole Laursen
| Decision (unanimous)
| Hero's 4
| 
| align=center| 3
| align=center| 5:00
| Tokyo, Japan
| 
|-
| Loss
| align=center| 14–4–1
| Norifumi Yamamoto
| TKO (punches)
| K-1 PREMIUM 2005 Dynamite!!
| 
| align=center| 1
| align=center| 4:39
| Osaka, Japan
| 
|-
| Win
| align=center| 14–3–1
| Hiroyuki Takaya
| Submission (triangle choke)
| Hero's 3
| 
| align=center| 2
| align=center| 3:47
| Tokyo, Japan
| 
|-
| Win
| align=center| 13–3–1
| Kazuyuki Miyata
| Submission (armbar)
| Hero's 3
| 
| align=center| 2
| align=center| 4:45
| Tokyo, Japan
| 
|-
| Win
| align=center| 12–3–1
| Ramon Dekkers
| Submission (heel hook)
| Hero's 1
| 
| align=center| 1
| align=center| 2:54
| Saitama, Japan
| 
|-
| Win
| align=center| 11–3–1
| Royler Gracie
| KO (punches)
| K-1 MMA ROMANEX
| 
| align=center| 1
| align=center| 3:40
| Saitama, Japan
| 
|-
| Win
| align=center| 10–3–1
| Mike Brown
| Submission (triangle armbar)
| UFC 47
| 
| align=center| 1
| align=center| 3:31
| Paradise, Nevada, United States
| 
|-
| Win
| align=center| 9–3–1
| Butterbean
| Submission (heel hook)
| K-1 PREMIUM 2003 Dynamite!!
| 
| align=center| 2
| align=center| 0:41
| Nagoya, Japan
| 
|-
| Loss
| align=center| 8–3–1
| Duane Ludwig
| Decision (split)
| UFC 42
| 
| align=center| 3
| align=center| 5:00
| Miami, Florida, United States
| 
|-
| Win
| align=center| 8–2–1
| Leigh Remedios
| Submission (rear-naked choke)
| UFC 38
| 
| align=center| 2
| align=center| 1:38
| London, England
| 
|-
| Win
| align=center| 7–2–1
| Kenichi Yamamoto
| Submission (rear-naked choke)
| Rings: World Title Series 5
| 
| align=center| 2
| align=center| 1:46
| Yokohama, Japan
| 
|-
| Win
| align=center| 6–2–1
| Brian Lo-A-Njoe
| Submission (triangle choke)
| Rings: Battle Genesis Vol. 8
| 
| align=center| 1
| align=center| 2:17
| Tokyo, Japan
| 
|-
| Win
| align=center| 5–2–1
| Craig Oxley
| Submission (achilles lock)
| Pancrase – Trans 6
| 
| align=center| 1
| align=center| 3:14
| Tokyo, Japan
| 
|-
|  Draw
| align=center| 4–2–1
| André Pederneiras
| Draw
| C2K – Colosseum 2000
| 
| align=center| 1
| align=center| 15:00
| Tokyo, Japan
| 
|-
| Loss
| align=center| 4–2
| Kiuma Kunioku
| Decision (unanimous)
| Pancrase – Trans 2
| 
| align=center| 2
| align=center| 3:00
| Osaka, Japan
| 
|-
| Win
| align=center| 4–1
| Nate Marquardt
| Submission (armbar)
| Pancrase – Breakthrough 11
| 
| align=center| 1
| align=center| 13:31
| Yokohama, Japan
| 
|-
| Win
| align=center| 3–1
| Victor Hunsaker
| TKO (submission to elbows)
| Pancrase – Breakthrough 9
| 
| align=center| 1
| align=center| 1:43
| Tokyo, Japan
| 
|-
| Loss
| align=center| 2–1
| Minoru Toyonaga
| Decision (unanimous)
| Pancrase – 1999 Neo-Blood Tournament Second Round
| 
| align=center| 2
| align=center| 3:00
| Tokyo, Japan
| 
|-
| Win
| align=center| 2–0
| Kousei Kubota
| Decision (unanimous)
| Pancrase – 1999 Neo-Blood Tournament Opening Round
| 
| align=center| 2
| align=center| 3:00
| Tokyo, Japan
| 
|-
| Win
| align=center| 1–0
| Tiki Ghosn
| Decision (draw overturned)
| ES 2 – Extreme Shoot 2
| 
| align=center| 3
| align=center| 5:00
| Mission Viejo, California, United States
| 
|-

Submission grappling record
KO PUNCHES
|- style="text-align:center; background:#f0f0f0;"
| style="border-style:none none solid solid; "|Result
| style="border-style:none none solid solid; "|Opponent
| style="border-style:none none solid solid; "|Method
| style="border-style:none none solid solid; "|Event
| style="border-style:none none solid solid; "|Date
| style="border-style:none none solid solid; "|Round
| style="border-style:none none solid solid; "|Time
| style="border-style:none none solid solid; "|Notes
|-
|Loss|| Vitor Belfort || || ADCC 2001 Absolute|| 2001|| 3|| ||
|-
|Loss|| Rodrigo Gracie || || ADCC 2001 –77 kg|| 2001|| 3|| ||
|-
|Win|| Caol Uno || Decision || The CONTENDERS 2000|| 2000|| 2|| ||
|-

Kickboxing record

Legend:

Bibliography
The following books are all essays.

Discography

Film actor roles
2002: Madness in Bloom (凶気の桜)
2005: Fly, Daddy, Fly (フライ,ダディ,フライ)
2005: Swirling Fire (鳶がクルリと)
2008: R246 STORY「ありふれた帰省」
2010: Kamen Rider W Forever: A to Z/The Gaia Memories of Fate
2012: Rurouni Kenshin (るろうに剣心)

Original video
2011: Kamen Rider W Returns: Kamen Rider Eternal

Television drama roles
Friday Night Drama (TV Asahi)
Sky High 2 (2004)
Maid Deka (2009)

Titles
JOC Cup All Japan Junior Wrestling Championship Winner(1996)
Hero's Middleweight Tournament Runner-up

Awards
Martial arts
UFC 38 Tap Out Award
UFC 38 Best Fighter Award
UFC 47 Tap Out Award
UFC 47 Best Fighter Award
Movie
Spotlight Award (Short Short Film Festival & Asia 2008)
Japanese calligraphy
Newcomer Encouragement Award (15th Taisho exhibition)

See also
List of male mixed martial artists

References

External links
 
 
 Management office
 

1978 births
Living people
Japanese male mixed martial artists
Lightweight mixed martial artists
Mixed martial artists utilizing Greco-Roman wrestling
Mixed martial artists utilizing kickboxing
Mixed martial artists utilizing sambo
Mixed martial artists utilizing Brazilian jiu-jitsu
Ultimate Fighting Championship male fighters
Japanese sambo practitioners
Japanese practitioners of Brazilian jiu-jitsu
People awarded a black belt in Brazilian jiu-jitsu
Japanese submission wrestlers
Japanese male sport wrestlers
Sportspeople from Tokyo
Japanese Buddhists
Constitutional Democratic Party of Japan politicians
Members of the House of Councillors (Japan)
21st-century Japanese singers
Japanese male dancers
Japanese dance music singers
Japanese male pop singers
Japanese sportsperson-politicians
Japanese actor-politicians
21st-century Japanese male singers
Politicians from Tokyo